Lauren Elizabeth Holt (born March 12, 1991) is an American actress, comedian, and singer. She began her career with the Upright Citizens Brigade, an improv and sketch comedy troupe in Los Angeles. In 2020, Holt, alongside Andrew Dismukes and Punkie Johnson, was hired to join the cast of the NBC sketch comedy series Saturday Night Live as a featured player, appearing during the show's 46th season between 2020 and 2021.

Early life
Holt is from Charlotte, North Carolina and is the daughter of Lyn Holt and Harris Holt, an artist and business owner. Holt graduated from Myers Park High School in 2009. She attended the University of North Carolina at Greensboro, where she was a member of Sigma Sigma Sigma, graduating with a Bachelor of Fine Arts Degree in studio art in 2013.

Career
Holt began her career after joining the Upright Citizens Brigade in Los Angeles. With the UCB, Holt was a founding member of a musical improv troupe The Pickup. In 2015, she appeared in the music video for the song "Til It Happens to You" by Lady Gaga.

In 2018, Holt starred in the short film Parent Teacher Conference, for which she was nominated for Best Actress at the Atlanta Comedy Film Festival.

On December 1, 2020, Holt was listed in Forbes 30 Under 30.

Saturday Night Live
In 2020, Holt was cast as a featured player on Saturday Night Live in its forty-sixth season.

Filmography

References

External links
 
 SNL Adds UNCG Alumna Lauren Holt to Cast

1991 births
Living people
21st-century American actresses
21st-century American comedians
American sketch comedians
American television actresses
American women comedians
Actresses from Charlotte, North Carolina
Comedians from North Carolina
University of North Carolina at Greensboro alumni